The 2010 Philadelphia Union season is the first season of the team's existence, competing in Major League Soccer, the top flight of American soccer. The Union were the sixteenth franchise to join the league in 2010 and were managed under former MLS player, Peter Nowak.

Background

Review

Preseason
Philadelphia Union defeated the University of North Carolina Tar Heels, 0–5, in their first ever pre-season match on February 13, 2010, in Greensboro, North Carolina.

On February 28, during a preseason tour of Mexico, The Union played to a 2–2 draw against the Chivas de Guadalajara reserves.  Two days later, The Union defeated Mexican second-division side Universidad de Guadalajara 0–1.

On March 14, the Union played their first friendly against an MLS opponent, losing 2–0 to FC Dallas in a match played in Tampa, Florida.  Five days later, in their final pre-season friendly, The Union played the Tampa Bay Rowdies (a fellow first-year expansion club, albeit in the second-division NASL) and lost 1–0.

March
Philadelphia began their first Major League Soccer regular season on the road with a nationally televised match against Seattle Sounders FC on March 25, 2010.  Union central defender Danny Califf received the first booking in Union history, by receiving a Yellow Card 33 seconds into the match.

Rookie Toni Ståhl (playing out of position at the other center back) was the first Union player to be sent off, after being booked in the 22nd and 37th minutes.

Two first-half goals from Brad Evans and Fredy Montero were too much for the ten-man Union, as they went down to defeat 2–0 in their first match, in front of a crowd of over 36,000 rabid Seattle fans—and about 100 hearty Sons of Ben who made the trip.

After the game, the Union released Costa Rican defender David Myrie, and sent Ståhl out on loan to their USL-2 affiliate, Harrisburg.

April
Philadelphia's first home match was on April 10, against D.C. United. The Union scored a 3–2 victory with a hat-trick by Sebastian Le Toux in front of a crowd of just under 35,000 at their temporary home, Lincoln Financial Field. The Union was bolstered by the signing of defender Cristian Arrieta from the Puerto Rico Islanders earlier in the week.

On April 15, the Union began a four-game league road trip with a visit to Toronto FC.  This was TFC's home opener and the first match played on BMO Field's new natural grass surface. The Union dropped the match 2–1 thanks to a first-half red card from captain Danny Califf and a late penalty. The Union showed heart being a man down for the majority of the match after pulling back a goal through Jordan Harvey.

The Union then played rival New York Red Bulls twice in four days at Red Bull Arena.  First, on the 24th in a league match, the Union dropped a second straight 2–1 decision. After pulling into a tie thanks to Sebastien Le Toux, the Union again were made to suffer loss from a defensive blunder which led to a game-winning penalty. Later in the week, the Union again faced the New York Red Bulls, but this time in a U.S. Open Cup qualifier.  The winner of that cup tie would host New England Revolution in the next round of qualifying, May 12. The Union was again on the losing side of a 2–1 scoreline with Sebastian Le Toux scoring a late goal to make things interesting after the Union had trailed 2–0 at the half. The Union were given their first major injury scare when leading scorer Sebastian Le Toux was carried off the field with what appeared to be a major knee injury. The Union were eliminated from the U.S. Open Cup.

May
The Union continued their long road trip on May 1 against the league-leading and undefeated Los Angeles Galaxy. The Union were outclassed, giving up a goal in the first minute and ultimately trailed the match 3–0 at the half. Midfielder Stefani Miglioranzi was red-carded in the 44th minute. The Union played the entire second-half a man-down and held the Galaxy scoreless. The Union notched a goal through Jack McInerney, his first professional goal, making the final score 3–1.

The Union concluded their first major roadtrip on May 8 against defending MLS Cup Champion Real Salt Lake. The Union would lose the game 3–0, a scoreline which did not accurately reflect the competitiveness of a game played mostly in the midfield.

On May 15, the Union returned home to Philadelphia to play FC Dallas before a crowd of just over 25,000 at Lincoln Financial Field. The Union went behind early, but showed great attacking flair and were kept scoreless only thanks to the heroics of FC Dallas goalkeeper Kevin Hartman. Late in stoppage time in the second half, the Union's number-one draft pick Danny Mwanga struck a beautiful volley into the lower left corner of the net to give the Union an important tie. Sebastian Le Toux returned to play for the first time since late April after recovering from a knee injury.

June

July

August

September

October

2010 roster

As of August 31, 2010.

Competitions

Preseason

MLS regular season

League tables

Eastern Conference

Overall

Results

U.S. Open Cup

Friendlies

Statistics

Statistics are from all MLS matches.  Ages are as of March 25, 2010 (the date of their season opener).

* = Not currently part of team.

Goalkeepers

* = Not currently part of team.

Honors and awards

MLS Team of the Week

Italics indicates MLS Player of the Week

MLS Goal of the Week

MLS Save of the Week

Transfers

In

Draft picks

Out

References

External links
 Philadelphia Union website
 2010 Philadelphia Union season at ESPN

Philadelphia Union seasons
Philadelphia Union
American soccer clubs 2010 season
2010 Major League Soccer season